Richard Goddard (1676–1732), of Swindon, Wiltshire, was an English politician.

He was a Member (MP) of the Parliament of Great Britain for Wootton Bassett from 1710 to 1713 and for Wiltshire from 1722 to 1727.

References

1676 births
1732 deaths
People from Swindon
Members of the Parliament of Great Britain for Wiltshire
British MPs 1710–1713
British MPs 1722–1727